Orenburg State Institute of Management (OSIM) is a Russian international state university which is training specialists in such spheres as:
 Economics;
 Management;
 Management of Organization;
 Public and Municipal Management;
 Information Management;
 Information Technologies and Security;
 Economics and Management of Enterprise (Municipal Services);
 Accounting, Analysis and Audit;
 Business Informatics;
 Applied Information Science;
 Innovation;
 Tourism.

OSIM is the only institution, that holds "program of management training for organizations of national economy (presidential program)" and MBA.
Currently, about 5000 students from Russia and other countries are being trained in OSIM.

History of OSIM 

1991 - foundation of Interregional Institute of Management (primary name of OSIM). 
1998 - the institute gained the exclusive right to participate in the realisation of the State Plan for training managers for organizations of the national economy of the Russian Federation (known abroad as the "Presidential program") 
1999 - by the order of the Russian Federation government, the institute was renamed to Orenburg State Institute of Management. 
2002 - a branch of OSIM was opened in Orsk city. 
2014 - Orenburg State Institute of Management integrated with Orenburg State University.

Faculties 

Faculty of Economics 
Faculty of Management  
Faculty of Informational Technologies

International summer school on ecology and civil liability

Every year in August, under the auspices of the Orenburg regional government, OSIM plans to carry out the Volunteer Ecological Program “The Ural Trail”. The Summer School students will be the first participants of the program. They will help to landscape the first camp on the “Ural Trail” and other parts of the Trail. 
The program consists of three parts (a week for each part). The first part offers an intensive course in the Russian language (4 contact hours a day). The second part combines a course in the Russian language with practical seminars on ecology and ecological management, based on the experience of big industrial enterprises. And the third part includes volunteer work and development of the Socio-Ecological projects.

Student organisations 
Political club OSIM 
Hockey club OSIM

Publications of OSIM 

Academical journal  «Intellect. Innovations. Investments»

References

External links 
 Official OSIM website
 Official OSIM International website
  OSIM Hockey club
  Shanghai Cooperation Organisation

Business schools in Russia